Francesco Mariotti (born 1943) is a Swiss artist and cultural activist. He was born in Bern, Switzerland. He has residences in Zürich, Switzerland and Punta Sal, Peru.

First projects 

Mariotti was born in Bern in 1943 and moved to Peru in 1952. He then studied at the University of Fine Arts of Hamburg between 1965 and 1968. After graduation, he was chosen by the "Project Geldmacher – Mariotti" to participate in an interactive art installation for Documenta 4 in Kassel. He exhibited "The Circular Movement of Light" for the 1969 X São Paulo Biennial.

Period in Peru 

In 1971 Mariotti moved back to Peru. During that period he was approached by Alfonso Castrillon, who at that time was the Director of the Institute of Contemporary Art (located at the Italian Art Museum), who invited him for a solo show. Mariotti proposed Castrillon a different idea: to develop open the game by calling artists and cross-cutting creative agents in a sort of festival, which challenged all categories and hierarchies.  Mariotti organised Contacta 71, total art festival whose results were so successful that it was organised for a second year with the support of the military junta. Then Mariotti is hired by the Government to work for the National System of Social Mobilization (SINAMOS). Mariotti and María Luy, his partner, were absorbed by the promises of a revolution Andean, and moved in September 1972 to Cusco and Puno, where they develop art and communication projects in popular sectors, which includes the socialization of serigraphic techniques among the peasant population. The first event he organised was the Homage to the 3rd of October (the day of the revolution), a massive popular parade in the main plaza of Cuzco. He then developed the Hatariy (November 1972, organised in collaboration with the House of Culture - INC) and Inkarri (1973 and 1974) Festivals in Cuzco. SINAMOS decided to establish Inkarri as a nationwide popular festival and a final competition that took place at the Campo de Marte.

In 1976 he created a course "Conception and development of projects of art and communication" ("Concepción y desarrollo de proyectos de arte y comunicación") at the National School of Fine Arts in Lima, being the first time such a course is given in the country. The success was limited, only three students were registered, which demonstrated the conservative environment at that time.

In the late 1970s, after the military junta was over, he returned to Lima and started Huayco E.P.S (the acronym for "Aesthetics of Social Projection"), created as a creative cooperative studio.

Return to Europe 

The eighties provided a very complex and uncertain panorama in Peru and Mariotti along with his family decided to move back to Switzerland. From 1981 to 1986 he collaborated with Rinaldo Bianda at the Fabiana Gallery and in the VideoArt Festival of Locarno, becoming the General Secretary of the festival (1982 - 1987). In 1987 he moved to Zurich, where he lives today, undertaking systematic work linked to the creation of lighting and kinetic sculptures, which consisted of metallic structures (usually of industrial materials) to which were added circuits, sensors and computers, creating hybrid sculptures that create the perception of being alive (some recite poetry, others speak, etc.). He was one of the first artists to work intensively with LED before it became mainstream.

His work was part of an exploration to analyze nature through oral traditions and Andean and Amazonian myths, to confrontation, in the late 90s, natural and ecological contexts, producing its first hybrid gardens and quantum gardens and developing renaturalization projects in collaboration with scientists and activists.

His works are in collections of major museums and private collections, such as the ZKM Museum für Neue Kunst, Karlsruhe, Germany; Kunstmuseum Celle mit Sammlung Robert Simon, Germany; MALI Lima, Perú; Museo de Bellas Artes, Caracas, Venezuela; Kunsthaus Zürich; Video Library Sammlung Julius Bär, Switzerland; UBS, Locarno, Switzerland.

In 2018 as a part of series of events organized worldwide to celebrate the 50 years of the Leonardo journal, a local tribute to Mariotti was given by Alta Tecnología Andina - ATA, the National School of Fine Arts in Lima and Proyecto Amil to mark the 50th anniversary of the "Projekt Geldmacher-Mariotti 1968" during the documenta4 in Kassel.

Sources 
 Buntinx, Gustavo. 1999. "El Retorno de las Luciérnagas: deseo aurático y voluntad chamánica en las tecnoesculturas de Francisco Mariotti." In (in)disciplinas. UNAM.
 Mariátegui, José-Carlos. "Peruvian Video/Electronic Art." Leonardo 35, no. 4 (2002): 355–63. https://www.jstor.org/stable/1577392.
 Mariátegui, José-Carlos. 2003. "Roger Atasi/Francesco Mariotti: deux génerations/une historie brève."  Turbulences vidéo (39):16–17.
 Plagemann, Volker. 2000. "Geldmacher-Mariotti auf der 4. documenta 1968." In Klaus Geldmacher: Kunst und Politik, 30–45. Herausgeber / Kunstmuseum in derl Alten Post.
 Sánchez Castro, Rebeca. 2013. Entrada al campo inexplorado: Gran Guacamayo Precolombino de Francesco Mariotti en la Trienal de Chile 2009.

References

External links 

 Francesco Mariotti's official website
 EPS HUAYCO – OpenEdition Books

1942 births
Living people
Artists from Bern
Swiss artists
University of Fine Arts of Hamburg alumni